The Langmead Collection is a collection of British and Irish telegraph stamps and stationery from 1851 to 1881 that forms part of the British Library Philatelic Collections. It was formed by Peter Langmead and received by the Library under the "in lieu of tax" scheme in 1991.

References

Further reading 
 The Telegraph Stamps and Stationery of Great Britain, 1851-1954, by Alan K. Huggins & Peter Langmead, Great Britain Philatelic Society, United Kingdom, 2003. 

British Library Philatelic Collections
Philately of the United Kingdom
Cinderella stamps